Pedro Morenés y Álvarez de Eulate, (born 17 September 1948) is a Spanish politician who was minister of defence and Ambassador of Spain to the United States of America. Prior to his appointment as minister, he was president of Real Club de la Puerta de Hierro, from 2006 to 2011.

Early life and education
Morenés was born in Las Arenas, province of Vizcaya, on 17 September 1948. He is the second son of Don José María de Morenés y Carvajal, 4th Viscount of Alesón (son of the Count and Countess of the Asalto, Grandees of Spain) and Doña Ana Sofía Álvarez de Eulate y Mac-Mahón. He studied law at the University of Navarra and business administration at the University of Deusto. He obtained a master's degree in ship management and economics at the Bremen Institute of Shipping Economics.

Career
Morenés began his career as lawyer in 1979. After working private law firms, he became the head of the Legal Services branch of the Shipbuilding Division in the National Industry Institute (INI) in 1991. He also became a professor of vessel chartering and shipping freight in the Spanish Maritime Institute of Madrid and in the European Institute for Maritime Studies. In 1994, he was named as the managing director of the commercial branch of the Shipbuilding Division in the National Industry Institute (INI) and member of its steering committee. Next, he was appointed Secretary of State for Defence in the Ministry of Defence in May 1996. Four years later, in May 2000, he was appointed Secretary of State for Security in the Ministry of the Interior. His tenure lasted two years, and in August 2002, he became Secretary of State for Scientific and Technological Policy in the Ministry of Science and Technology. His tenure lasted until March 2005. He served as the secretary general of the Businessmen Association from March 2005 to June 2010. In January 2009, he was also appointed chairman of the Board of Directors of Construcciones Navales del Norte, and served there until January 2011. Then he began to serve as the chairman of MBDA Spain, a missile systems firm, in June 2010  and of Segur Ibérica, a private security firm, in January 2011. His tenure lasted until December 2011. He was appointed Defence Minister on 21 December 2011.

Morenés labelled the mission in Afghanistan as war, breaking a taboo in 2012.

Honours 
  : 
 Knight of the Royal Cavalry Armory of Zaragoza (14/11/1966).
 Knight Grand Cross of the Royal Order of Isabella the Catholic (07/05/2004).

Ancestry

References

External links 

1948 births
Living people
Ambassadors of Spain to the United States
Knights Grand Cross of the Order of Isabella the Catholic
Recipients of the Order of Isabella the Catholic
Defence ministers of Spain
Secretaries of State of Spain